The Blueprint 2: The Gift and the Curse (stylized as The Blueprint²: The Gift & the Curse) is the seventh studio album by American rapper Jay-Z. It was released on November 12, 2002, by Roc-A-Fella Records and Island Def Jam Music Group. The album serves as a sequel to his sixth album The Blueprint (2001). Parts of the album were later reissued for his album, titled Blueprint 2.1 (2003). The album debuted at number one, shipping with first-week sales of 545,000 units. The album is certified 3x Multi-Platinum by the RIAA. In 2013, Jay-Z cited this album as his second-worst due to an overabundance of songs on the album.

Background 

The recording sessions took place after Jay-Z's critically acclaimed and commercially successful sixth album The Blueprint (2001). The production on the album was handled primarily by Just Blaze and Kanye West – both of whom had recently established themselves as two of hip-hop's most celebrated producers due to the success of The Blueprint – while other producers include The Neptunes, Timbaland, No I.D., Darrell "Digga" Branch, Charlemagne, Big Chuck, Dr. Dre, Jimmy Kendrick, Heavy D, and Neff-U. Unlike The Blueprint which was almost void of guest appearances, The Blueprint² features many featured guests, even out-of-genre artists that include Lenny Kravitz and Sean Paul. Other features include West Coast rapper and producer Dr. Dre, Rakim, Beyoncé, Faith Evans, Beanie Sigel and Scarface. The album also includes an uncredited verse from Kanye West on the Timbaland-produced track "The Bounce". Pharrell also provides vocals and hooks of many of his produced tracks, for example "Excuse Me Miss" and "Nigga Please". Though the album has no strict concept, the album contains two discs. The first disc titled "The Gift" features mainstream, pop-oriented music. The second disc titled "The Curse" contains dark, emotional, and bravado street songs such as the dark-toned retelling of "Meet the Parents", the emotional substance of escaping the dangerous ghetto in "Some How Some Way", the dissing of Nas and Jaz-O in "Blueprint2", and the bravado "Nigga Please".

"The Bounce"

West's verse on the track "The Bounce" marked his first appearance as a rapper on a Roc-A-Fella release (although he contributed an uncredited hook to the Blueprint's "Never Change" the previous year), which was on the sequel to The Blueprint (2001), an album he helped produce.

Vocals from Audio Two's 1987 single "Top Billin'" are sampled throughout the song. As well as this, it samples vocals from Alka Yagnik and Ila Arun's 1993 song "Choli Ke Peeche Kya Hai" throughout.  Pitchfork described "The Bounce" as Jay-Z showing 'extreme assonance'. In 2003, the track peaked at number 12 on the US Billboard Bubbling Under R&B/Hip-Hop Singles chart and remained on it for a total of seven weeks.

Critical reception 

The Blueprint 2 received lukewarm reviews from critics. At Metacritic, which assigns a normalized rating out of 100 to reviews from mainstream publications, the album received an average score of 64, based on 19 reviews. According to Nathan Rabin, the record "led many to claim that [Jay-Z] lost his vise-like grip on rap music". In his review for The A.V. Club, Rabin deemed it "overreaching but surprisingly solid", featuring a first disc of clever pop-rap jams and a second that was "darker and more erratic". Rolling Stone critic Christian Hoard said The Blueprint 2 was another "strong record from hip-hop's most dependable voice" but felt Jay-Z's flow was more impressive than the production, finding it "long on both bouncy funk and forgettable R&B samples". AllMusic's John Bush believed Jay-Z showcased some exceptional songs but could not carry the 110-minute double album as consistently as its predecessor. Soren Baker was more critical in the Chicago Tribune. He felt Jay-Z's reworking of other rappers' music ("A Dream", "'03 Bonnie & Clyde", and "The Watcher 2") was unimaginative while the rest of the album lacked his usual enthusiasm. "It reminds me of nearly every other double CD", David Browne wrote in Entertainment Weekly. "It could have been a good single disc." Robert Christgau named "U Don't Know (Remix)" and "Poppin' Tags" as highlights while writing in his Village Voice consumer guide that he was disappointed Jay-Z sampled Paul Anka for "I Did It My Way" when he could not get permission to use Frank Sinatra's recording of "My Way".

Rollie Pemberton was more enthusiastic in his review for Pitchfork, writing that Jay-Z "weaves his way through every imaginable style and flavor with unyielding expertise". Billboard hailed it as "the most ambitious and most fully realized album of his career", while Q felt it surpassed his previous album. In the opinion of Spin critic Chris Ryan, The Blueprint 2 found Jay-Z "tightening the screws of his delivery" and discovering a "bruising poetry in a flow that once seemed clumsily conversational".

Track listing

Blueprint 2.1

Blueprint 2.1 is a reissue by rapper Jay-Z, created from a re-cut version of The Blueprint 2: The Gift & The Curse. It was certified gold by the RIAA. One single was released from the album, "La-La-La".

Track listing

In other media
 "U Don't Know (Remix)" was featured in Madden NFL 2005

Bonus tracks 
The album contains two bonus tracks (after "What They Gonna Do, Pt. II") not included in The Blueprint 2: The Gift & The Curse. The track "Stop" is a new cut and "La-La-La (Excuse Me Miss Again)" can also be found on the soundtrack to the 2003 film Bad Boys II . The bonus tracks are unlisted and do not have track numbers. The Jay-Z remix of Punjabi MC's "Beware of the Boys" is included as an additional bonus track on the European version only and is lifted off Punjabi MC's album/CDS.

In other media
 "U Don't Know (Remix)" was featured in Madden NFL 2005
 "The Bounce" was featured in NBA 2K13

Charts

Weekly charts

Year-end charts

Certifications

See also
List of number-one albums of 2002 (U.S.)
List of number-one R&B albums of 2002 (U.S.)

References

External links 
 

Jay-Z albums
2002 albums
Albums produced by Dr. Dre
Albums produced by Just Blaze
Albums produced by Kanye West
Albums produced by the Neptunes
Albums produced by No I.D.
Albums produced by Timbaland
Def Jam Recordings albums
Roc-A-Fella Records albums
Sequel albums